Journal of Theoretical Politics is a quarterly peer-reviewed academic journal that covers the field of political science. It is published by SAGE Publications. It was established in 1989 and the editors-in-chief are Torun Dewan (London School of Economics) and John W. Patty (Emory University).

Abstracting and Indexing 
The journal is abstracted and indexed in Academic Search Premier, International Political Science Abstracts, Scopus, and the Social Sciences Citation Index. According to the Journal Citation Reports, the journal has a 2014 impact factor of 0.837, ranking it 70th out of 161 journals in the category "Political Science".

References

External links 
 

SAGE Publishing academic journals
Quarterly journals
Political science journals
Publications established in 1989
English-language journals